Fábio Daniel Januário known simply as Januário (born September 3, 1979 in Londrina, Paraná, Brazil) is a retired Brazilian professional footballer. He played for Esteghlal in the Iran's Premier Football League before being released because of heavy injury. He usually played in the midfielder position.

Club career
Januário began playing club football with Cascavel Esporte Clube while he was studying engineering. After he received his degree, he started his professional career playing for a number of provincial league teams in Brazil before moving the Campeonato Brasileiro Série A team Esporte Clube Vitória. After a season at Esporte Clube Vitória he moved from the Campeonato Brasileira Seria A to the Portuguese Liga where he played for Gil Vicente and C.F. Os Belenenses. He then moved to Iran where he started playing for Foolad in 2006. In 2008, he moved to Esteghlal, talent has dramatically went up and has been in the starting line-up for most of the 2008–09 season and has established great popularity with Esteghlal fans. On 27 April 2009, he netted his fourth goal of the season which eventually made Esteghlal the league champions.

On 26 May 2010, he joined Sepahan in the Iran Pro League with the contract amount of $1,200.000. He returned to Esteghlal after spending two seasons in Sepahan by signing a one-year contract. However, before the season ended, he separated from the team due to foot injury in January 2013. He announced his retirement on 29 June 2013.

* 1st Division of Campeonato Paranaense** 1st Division of Campeonato Capixaba

Club career statistics
Last update  26 September 2012 

 Assist goals

Honours

Club
Esteghlal
Iran Pro League (1): 2008–09

Sepahan
Iran Pro League (2): 2010–11 , 2011–12

References

External links
 Stats in PersianLeague http://www.persianleague.com/index.php/teams?id=119&view=player
 

1979 births
Living people
Brazilian footballers
Primeira Liga players
Persian Gulf Pro League players
Azadegan League players
Esporte Clube Vitória players
C.F. Os Belenenses players
Gil Vicente F.C. players
Foolad FC players
Esteghlal F.C. players
Sepahan S.C. footballers
Brazilian expatriate footballers
Expatriate footballers in Portugal
Expatriate footballers in Iran
Sportspeople from Londrina
Association football midfielders